The 1986 Monte Carlo Open, also known by its sponsored name Volvo Monte Carlo Open, was a men's tennis tournament played on outdoor clay courts at the Monte Carlo Country Club in Roquebrune-Cap-Martin, France that was part of the 1986 Nabisco Grand Prix. It was the 80th edition of the tournament and was held from 21 April until 27 April 1986. Third-seeded Joakim Nyström won the singles title.

Finals

Singles
 Joakim Nyström defeated  Yannick Noah, 6–3, 6–2
 It was Nyström 4th singles title of the year and the 11th of his career.

Doubles
 Guy Forget /  Yannick Noah defeated  Joakim Nyström /  Mats Wilander, 6–4, 3–6, 6–4

References

External links
 
 ATP tournament profile
 ITF tournament edition details

Monte Carlo Open
Monte-Carlo Masters
1986 in Monégasque sport
Monte